Jack Stauber (born April 6, 1996) is an American musician, singer-songwriter, designer, animator, and internet personality based in Pittsburgh, Pennsylvania. He is originally from Erie, Pennsylvania. He is known for his VHS-aesthetic live-action, stop motion, and computer animated music videos — which contain strange lyrics and have been featured in a wide array of internet memes on YouTube and TikTok over the years. Stauber first uploaded to YouTube on April 20, 2013. His website was launched in late 2017, though it consists mostly of links to his social media and merch stores. Stauber has been a member of the bands Joose and Zaki. In 2020, he won the Shorty Award for Best in Weird.

His debut album, Finite Form (2013), was released on March 18, 2013, when he was 16. Drawing inspiration from folk music, his second album, Viator (2015), was released two years later, on September 18, 2015. Stauber's third studio album Pop Food (2017) experimented with pop, lo-fi, and a 1980s/1990s-esque aesthetic. Its first two tracks, "Buttercup" & "Oh Klahoma," went viral on both YouTube and TikTok, and also boast a combined  540 million Spotify streams as of March 2023. His latest album, HiLo (2018), contains elements of funk, pop, and rock.

Personal life 
Stauber grew up in Erie, Pennsylvania. He has one sister, named Kharly. He majored in marketing and minored in studio arts at the University of Pittsburgh. In an interview, Stauber revealed his favorite cartoon is Rugrats, and praised the art style, stating "Take some time to watch a minute of the pilot of Rugrats if you haven’t seen that before. The art style is beyond incredible." Stauber is also a fan of Pink Floyd – The Wall, Merrie Melodies, the Pink Panther, M83, Bruce Bickford, The Mighty Boosh, Donovan, and The Residents.

Notable projects and videos

"Buttercup" and "Oh Klahoma" 
Stauber's best known song, "Buttercup", is the opening song released on his 2017 album Pop Food. The song, along with remixes and covers of it, became a popular internet meme, especially on TikTok, which contributed substantially to its success. The song had 375 million Spotify streams as of March 2023. Stauber did not release an official music video for "Buttercup". The song has been described as "bubbly, dramatic pop with Panda Bear-esque vocals." YouTuber lisuga made a popular fan made video using clips from the Japanese anime short film, Kick-Heart. It is the most viewed Jack Stauber-related video on YouTube, with 227 million views as of July 2022.

"Oh Klahoma", the second track from Pop Food, also became popular. The song has 163 million Spotify streams as of March 2023. The song is most famously used as background music to a TikTok trend called #ghostphotoshoot, where creators dress up as ghosts and take photos of themselves, sometimes wearing sunglasses and other fashion accessories. However, the trend has become controversial, with critics saying the bedsheet costumes used look like KKK robes.

Adult Swim 
Stauber has done multiple projects for Adult Swim. These projects have received widespread praise, getting millions of views on YouTube.

Wishing Apple and Valentine's Day is Not for the Lonely 
The first short Stauber created for Adult Swim was called "Wishing Apple," a short released on July 3, 2018 on the Adult Swim YouTube channel.

The next was "Valentine's Day is Not for the Lonely," which premiered on Off The Air's season eight episode "Love" on August 28, 2018. However, the short was created and released on Valentine's Day, almost 6 months before the short was released on Adult Swim, on February 14, 2018. The video was also shortened for its Adult Swim premiere.

SHOP: A Pop Opera 
Nearly a year after "Valentine's Day is Not for the Lonely" was created, the surrealist musical comedy SHOP: A Pop Opera premiered on Adult Swim in March 2019. The series utilizes mixed media, incorporated clay animation, music, and VHS-like filters. The six-part series aired each episode at midnight from March 4 to March 9. The episodes were also uploaded onto YouTube the next day. A year later, Stauber released the soundtrack for the miniseries on March 8, after someone hacked into his account and fraudulently uploaded the soundtrack in October of the previous year. On November 4, 2020, the full series was uploaded onto the Adult Swim YouTube channel.

Jack Stauber's OPAL 
The latest Adult Swim project created by Stauber is a short surrealist musical psychological horror film, entitled Jack Stauber's OPAL, which premiered on October 31, 2020. The same day, OPAL was also released on the Adult Swim YouTube channel. Stauber also received help from the producers at Williams Street for the creation of OPAL. The series utilizes stop-motion, 3D-animated, and live action segments.

Style 

Meg Fair of Pittsburgh City Paper highlighted Stauber's knack of "pulling unrelated sounds and influences into [his] music, throwing them into a bowl and tossing them into a strange salad that challenges your musical taste buds." Jenna Minnig of PennState CommMedia compared Stauber's music to Ariel Pink's; as both have hypnagogic-pop styles and have similar voices, but believed it was unnecessary and reductionary to compare the two. Knoxville News Sentinel's Chuck Campbell described Stauber's music videos as "nostalgic and childlike, but there’s also something disturbingly adult about them, the kind of thing that might have surfaced on Pee-wee's Playhouse back in the day."

Music 
Stauber is well known for his hypnagogic pop, avant-pop, and synth-pop music. Stauber's unique vocal effects are developed in the shower, and are inspired by Donovan in his song "Hurdy Gurdy Man". Stauber also collects objects to create sounds to use in songs, and has a drawer filled with "various noise-makers" he has collected. Stauber uses the Plopscotch Records label to enlist copyright on his music.

Aside from his perennial avant-pop style, Stauber is well-versed in traditional guitar playing, regularly incorporating it into his music. Stauber’s album Viator is a particular example, for the fact it’s a radical contrast to the rest of his discography, both in music and tone. Viator consists of somber and bleak indie folk and lo-fi acoustic music. Despite this being the only folk album he’s released, Stauber would include songs in a vein like that of Viator, such as “Bothersome” and “Calm Water Fast Living” on Pop Food and Micropop respectively.

Artists that have expressed admiration for Stauber's music include rock musician Jon Bon Jovi, comedian Andy Milonakis, actor Verne Troyer, indie singer-songwriter Sidney Gish, and model Paris Jackson.

Videos 
Stauber's videos utilize a mixture of different types of media, such as traditional animation, 3D computer animation, claymation, and live action. Almost all voices in these videos are done by Stauber himself. His videos are usually separated into three styles: "surreal", characters with odd and striking facial expressions and frequently part of his claymations, "colorful", which are usually featured in his VHS animations and music videos, and "Stauber faces", light-skinned characters with cartoon noses.

To create his animations, Stauber uses Microsoft Paint for the drawings. He then sequences the frames in Adobe Premiere Pro, and then runs the finished video through a VHS tape.

Teeth play a constant theme in Stauber's work, often referenced in his music and videos. Teeth featured in Stauber's videos are most often fake, these false teeth being created using resin, though he has also sometimes used actual teeth in his work.

Awards and nominations

Discography

As Jack Stauber

Albums

Extended plays

Singles

Jack Stauber's Micropop 
Stauber also publishes under the name "Jack Stauber's Micropop", releasing extended versions of short songs found on his YouTube channel. These songs are less popular than his songs and albums released under his main name, Jack Stauber. These extended versions are often released early for Stauber's Patreon supporters. Under the Micropop name, Stauber has released six EPs and one compilation album, along with two soundtracks for his works with Adult Swim.

Albums

EPs

Notes

References

External links 

1996 births
Living people
Music YouTubers
Shorty Award winners
American YouTubers
YouTube animators
Animators from Pennsylvania
American folk musicians
American pop musicians
21st-century American musicians
American male singer-songwriters
American multi-instrumentalists
Internet memes
Singer-songwriters from Pennsylvania
YouTube channels launched in 2010
University of Pittsburgh alumni
21st-century American male singers
21st-century American singers
American tenors